"Original Prankster" is a song by American rock band the Offspring. It is featured as the third track from their sixth studio album, Conspiracy of One, and was released as its first single on October 10, 2000. The song features additional vocals by Redman and is included on the band's 2005 Greatest Hits album.

Prior to the release of Conspiracy of One, The Offspring distributed the track for free as a downloadable MP3 file on their official website. A competition was held, featuring a prize of $1 million (USD), which was awarded to a randomly selected participant who downloaded the song.

"Original Prankster" reached the top 10 in several countries, including Australia, Sweden, and the United Kingdom, and went to the top 10 on the US and Canadian rock charts. The single went Platinum in Australia in 2001, becoming the third song by The Offspring to reach Platinum status in that country after "Pretty Fly (for a White Guy)" and "Why Don't You Get a Job?."

Music video
The song follows the prankster, the subject of the song, through his life, pulling various pranks on his superiors, being motivated by Redman. As a child, he slips his dog's feces into his father's sandwich. In his teen years, he uses a bunsen burner on a perverted science teacher. When sent to the principal's office, he sets up the principal to be photographed in a compromising position with two students. Throughout the video, the band is shown to be playing around the Huntington Beach Pier in their hometown Huntington Beach, California.

Finally, in the present, he switches off the whole city's power supply, though the band still manages to play in the dark and the crowd use flares to light the scene. At the end of the video, lightning strikes the prankster and disintegrates him.

Track listings
Version 1

Australia CD Maxi

Promo CD

Personnel
The Offspring
 Dexter Holland – Vocals, rhythm guitar
 Noodles – Lead guitar
 Greg K. – Bass
 Ron Welty – Drums

Other personnel
 Produced and mixed by: Brendan O'Brien
 Engineered: Nick DiDia
 Mastered by: Eddy Schreyer

Charts and certifications

Weekly charts

Year-end charts

Certifications

Release history

In popular culture
The song was featured in Season 3 of The Cleveland Show in the episode "American Prankster". The song was also featured in the trailer for How to Eat Fried Worms. The song was also featured in the movie The Animal.

References

External links
 

The Offspring songs
2000 singles
Songs written by Dexter Holland
Song recordings produced by Brendan O'Brien (record producer)
Comedy rock songs
2000 songs
Columbia Records singles
Music videos directed by Dave Meyers (director)